The Journal of Urban Affairs is a peer-reviewed academic journal published ten times per year by Routledge on behalf of the Urban Affairs Association.  It was established in 1979 and the current editor-in-chief is Bernadette Hanlon (Ohio State University).  

According to the Journal Citation Reports, the journal has a 2020 impact factor of 3.377.

Editors-in-chief
The following persons are or have been editor-in-chief:
 Patricia Klobus Edwards (1981–1984)
 John R. Gist (1984–1987)
 Scott Cummings and Knowlton W. Johnson (1987–1989)
 Scott Cummings and C. Theodore Koebel (1989–1992)
 Scott Cummings and Hank Savitch (1993–1998)
 Scott Cummnings (1998–2005)
 Victoria Basolo (2005–2010)
 Laura Reese (2010–2015)
 Igor Vojnovic (2015–2021)
 Bernadette Hanlon (2021–present)

References

External links

Routledge academic journals
English-language journals
Publications established in 1979
Sociology journals